The British Diving Championships - 1 metre springboard winners are listed below.

The championships were not held in 2021 due to the COVID-19 pandemic.

1 metre springboard champions

References

Diving in the United Kingdom